Lake Bluff is a railroad station in the village of Lake Bluff, Illinois, on Metra's Union Pacific North Line. In Metra's zone-based fare system, Lake Bluff is in zone G. As of 2018, Lake Bluff is the 80th busiest of Metra's 236 non-downtown stations, with an average of 647 weekday boardings.

As of April 25, 2022, Lake Bluff is served by 23 trains in each direction on weekdays, by all 13 trains in each direction on Saturdays, and by all nine trains in each direction on Sundays.

The current station was built in 1904, and previously served the Chicago and North Western Railway before it was bought out by Union Pacific Railroad in 1995. Parking is available in front of the station on North Sheridan Road from the intersection of Scranton Avenue, and on Mawman Avenue off the southeast corner of Rockland Road. It was included in the National Register of Historic Places listing for the Lake Bluff Uptown Commercial Historic District in 2006.

The station was staffed until 2016.

The Union Pacific Lakes Sub parallels the station's trackage and connects with the line north of the station. It follows the line to a curve north of the Waukegan station, where the line ends. Union Pacific has a railyard in Waukegan that services Metra trains as well as their own.

References

External links

Metra - Lake Bluff Station
Southbound Train approaching the station (Metra Fan Photos)
Scranton Avenue entrance from Google Maps Street View

Metra stations in Illinois
Railway stations in the United States opened in 1904
Former Chicago and North Western Railway stations
Historic district contributing properties in Illinois
National Register of Historic Places in Lake County, Illinois
Railway stations on the National Register of Historic Places in Illinois
Railway stations in Cook County, Illinois
Union Pacific North Line